Conosema is a genus of moths of the family Erebidae. The genus was erected by George Hampson in 1926.

Species
Conosema alfura (Felder & Rogenhofer, 1874) Sulawesi
Conosema pratti (Bethune-Baker, 1908) New Guinea

References

Calpinae
Noctuoidea genera